John C. Merrill was Professor Emeritus at the University of Missouri School of Journalism.

Merrill is the author of 30 books and over 100 articles in journals. In 2007, a festschrift, Freedom Fighter, was issued in his honor.

References

University of Missouri faculty
Living people
Year of birth missing (living people)